Diethylstilbestrol monobenzyl ether (brand names Monozol, Hypantin, Pituitrope), also known as benzelstilbestrol, is a synthetic, nonsteroidal estrogen of the stilbestrol group and an ether of diethylstilbestrol (DES) that is described as a pituitary gland inhibitor (antigonadotropin) and was formerly marketed but is now no longer available. It was first synthesized by Wallace & Tiernan Company in 1952, and was described by them as having only weak estrogenic activity. The drug was used to treat gynecological conditions and infertility in women.

See also
 List of estrogen esters § Ethers of nonsteroidal estrogens

References

Estrogen ethers
Phenols
Synthetic estrogens